Algeria competed at the 1996 Summer Olympics in Atlanta, United States. 45 competitors, 39 men and 6 women, took part in 29 events in nine sports.

Medals

| width="100%" align="left" valign="top" |

| width="30%" align="left" valign="top" |

Athletics

Men
Track and road events

Women
Track and road events

Boxing

Fencing

Handball

Preliminary group B

9th Place Match

Team roster

Amar Daoud
Abdelghani Loukil
Redouane Aouachria
Salim Nedjel Hammou
Nabil Rouabhi
Redouane Saïdi
Ben Ali Beghouach
Sofiane Lamali
Abdeldjalil Bouanani
Mahmoud Bouanik
Rabah Gherbi
Achour Hasni
Sofiane Khalfallah
Mohamed Bouziane
Salim Abes
Karim El-Mahouab

Judo

Men

Women

Rowing

Women

Swimming

Men

Weightlifting

Wrestling

Freestyle

Greco-Roman

References

External links
Official Olympic Reports
International Olympic Committee results database

Nations at the 1996 Summer Olympics
1996
Olympics